In mathematics, a relation  on a set  is transitive if, for all elements , ,  in , whenever  relates   to  and  to , then  also relates  to . Each partial order as well as each equivalence relation needs to be transitive.

Definition 

A homogeneous relation  on the set  is a transitive relation if,
Or in terms of first-order logic:
,

Examples
As a non-mathematical example, the relation "is an ancestor of" is transitive. For example, if Amy is an ancestor of Becky, and Becky is an ancestor of Carrie, then Amy, too, is an ancestor of Carrie.

On the other hand, "is the birth parent of" is not a transitive relation, because if Alice is the birth parent of Brenda, and Brenda is the birth parent of Claire, then this does not imply that Alice is the birth parent of Claire. What is more, it is antitransitive: Alice can never be the birth parent of Claire.

Non-transitive, non-antitransitive relations include sports fixtures, 'knows' and 'talks to'.

"Is greater than", "is at least as great as", and "is equal to" (equality) are transitive relations on various sets, for instance, the set of real numbers or the set of natural numbers:

 whenever x > y and y > z, then also x > z
 whenever x ≥ y and y ≥ z, then also x ≥ z
 whenever x = y and y = z, then also x = z.

More examples of transitive relations:
 "is a subset of" (set inclusion, a relation on sets)
 "divides" (divisibility, a relation on natural numbers)
 "implies" (implication, symbolized by "⇒", a relation on propositions)

Examples of non-transitive relations:
 "is the successor of" (a relation on natural numbers)
 "is a member of the set" (symbolized as "∈")
 "is perpendicular to" (a relation on lines in Euclidean geometry)

Properties

Closure properties 
 The converse (inverse) of a transitive relation is always transitive. For instance, knowing that "is a subset of" is transitive and "is a superset of" is its converse, one can conclude that the latter is transitive as well.
 The intersection of two transitive relations is always transitive. For instance, knowing that "was born before" and "has the same first name as" are transitive, one can conclude that "was born before and also has the same first name as" is also transitive.
 The union of two transitive relations need not be transitive. For instance, "was born before or has the same first name as" is not a transitive relation, since e.g. Herbert Hoover is related to Franklin D. Roosevelt, which is in turn related to Franklin Pierce, while Hoover is not related to Franklin Pierce.
 The complement of a transitive relation need not be transitive. For instance, while "equal to" is transitive, "not equal to" is only transitive on sets with at most one element.

Other properties 
A transitive relation is asymmetric if and only if it is irreflexive.

A transitive relation need not be reflexive. When it is, it is called a preorder. For example, on set X = {1,2,3}:

 R = {(1,1), (2,2), (3,3), (1,3), (3,2)} is reflexive, but not transitive, as the pair (1,2) is absent,
 R = {(1,1), (2,2), (3,3), (1,3)} is reflexive as well as transitive, so it is a preorder,
 R = {(1,1), (2,2), (3,3)} is reflexive as well as transitive, another preorder.

Transitive extensions and transitive closure

Let  be a binary relation on set . For example, suppose  is a set of towns, some of which are connected by roads. Let  be the relation on towns where  if there is a road directly linking town  and town . This relation need not be transitive.

If a relation is transitive then its transitive extension is itself, that is, if  is a transitive relation then .

The transitive closure of a relation is a transitive relation.

The relation "is the birth parent of" on a set of people is not a transitive relation. However, in biology the need often arises to consider birth parenthood over an arbitrary number of generations: the relation "is a birth ancestor of" is a transitive relation and it is the transitive closure of the relation "is the birth parent of".

For the example of towns and roads above,  provided you can travel between towns  and  using any number of roads.

Relation types that require transitivity 
 Preorder – a reflexive and transitive relation
 Partial order – an antisymmetric preorder
 Total preorder – a connected (formerly called total) preorder
 Equivalence relation – a symmetric preorder
 Strict weak ordering – a strict partial order in which incomparability is an equivalence relation
 Total ordering – a connected (total), antisymmetric, and transitive relation

Counting transitive relations

No general formula that counts the number of transitive relations on a finite set  is known. However, there is a formula for finding the number of relations that are simultaneously reflexive, symmetric, and transitive – in other words, equivalence relations – , those that are symmetric and transitive, those that are symmetric, transitive, and antisymmetric, and those that are total, transitive, and antisymmetric. Pfeiffer has made some progress in this direction, expressing relations with combinations of these properties in terms of each other, but still calculating any one is difficult. See also Brinkmann and McKay (2005). Mala showed that no polynomial with integer coefficients can represent a formula for the number of transitive relations on a set, and found certain recursive relations that provide lower bounds for that number. He also showed that that number is a polynomial of degree two if  contains exactly two ordered pairs.

Related properties 

A relation R is called intransitive if it is not transitive, that is, if xRy and yRz, but not xRz, for some x, y, z.
In contrast, a relation R is called antitransitive if xRy and yRz always implies that xRz does not hold.
For example, the relation defined by xRy if xy is an even number is intransitive, but not antitransitive. The relation defined by xRy if x is even and y is odd is both transitive and antitransitive. 
The relation defined by xRy if x is the successor number of y is both intransitive and antitransitive. Unexpected examples of intransitivity arise in situations such as political questions or group preferences.

Generalized to stochastic versions (stochastic transitivity), the study of transitivity finds applications of in decision theory, psychometrics and utility models.

A quasitransitive relation is another generalization; it is required to be transitive only on its non-symmetric part. Such relations are used in social choice theory or microeconomics.

Proposition:  If R is a univalent, then R;RT is transitive.
 proof: Suppose  Then there are a and b such that  Since R is univalent, yRb and aRTy imply a=b. Therefore xRaRTz, hence xR;RTz and R;RT is transitive.

Corollary: If R is univalent, then R;RT is an equivalence relation on the domain of R.
 proof: R;RT is symmetric and reflexive on its domain. With univalence of R, the transitive requirement for equivalence is fulfilled.

See also

 Transitive reduction
 Intransitive dice
 Rational choice theory
 Hypothetical syllogism — transitivity of the material conditional

Notes

References 
 
 
Gunther Schmidt, 2010. Relational Mathematics. Cambridge University Press, .
 
 Pfeiffer, G. (2004). Counting transitive relations. Journal of Integer Sequences, 7(2), 3.

External links
 
 Transitivity in Action at cut-the-knot

Binary relations
Elementary algebra